April 2 - Eastern Orthodox liturgical calendar - April 4

All fixed commemorations below are observed on April 16 by Eastern Orthodox Churches on the Old Calendar.

For April 3rd, Orthodox Churches on the Old Calendar commemorate the Saints listed on March 21.

Saints

 Martyr Elpidephorus (3rd century)
 Martyrs Dius, Bithonius, and Galycus (3rd century)
 Martyrs Cassius, Philip, and Eutychius, of Thessaloniki (304)
 Virgin-martyrs Irene, Agapia and Chionia of Aquileia, in Thessaloniki (304) (see also: April 16)
 Martyr Ulphianus of Tyre (306)
 Virgin-martyr Theodosia of Tyre (308)  (see also: April 2)
 Martyrs Evagrius, Benignus, Chrestus, Arestus, Kinnudius, Rufus, Patricius, and Zosima, at Tomis in Moesia (c. 310)
 Venerable Illyrius, monk of Mount Myrsinon in the Peloponnese.
 Venerable Nicetas of Medikion (Nicetas the Confessor), Abbot of Medikion (824)
 Venerable Joseph the Hymnographer, of Sicily (883) (see also: April 4)

Pre-Schism Western saints

 Saint Pancras of Taormina (Pancratius), born in Antioch, consecrated by the Apostle Peter and sent to Taormina in Sicily where he was stoned to death (c. 40)
 Saint Sixtus I (Xystus), Pope of Rome from 117 to c 125, sometimes referred to as a martyr (c. 125)
 Saint Fara (Burgundofara) of Eboriac, now Faremoutiers (657)
 Saint Attala (Attalus), a monk and abbot of a monastery in Taormina in Sicily (ca. 800)

Post-Schism Orthodox saints

 Saint Philip I, Metropolitan of Moscow (1473) (see also: April 5)
 Saint Nectarius, founder of Bezhetsk Monastery, Tver (1492)
 New Martyr Paul the Russian at Constantinople (1683)  (see also: April 6)
 Venerable Amphilochios (Makris), Elder, of Patmos (1970) (see also: April 16 - ns)

Other commemorations

 Synaxis of the Icon of the Most Holy Theotokos "The Unfading Rose" (Unfading Blossom, Flower of Incorruption).

Icon gallery

Notes

References

Sources
 April 3 / April 16. Orthodox Calendar (Pravoslavie.ru).
 April 16 / April 3. Holy Trinity Russian Orthodox Church (A parish of the Patriarchate of Moscow).
 April 3. OCA - The Lives of the Saints.
 The Autonomous Orthodox Metropolia of Western Europe and the Americas. St. Hilarion Calendar of Saints for the year of our Lord 2004. St. Hilarion Press (Austin, TX). p. 26.
 April 3. Latin Saints of the Orthodox Patriarchate of Rome.
 The Roman Martyrology. Transl. by the Archbishop of Baltimore. Last Edition, According to the Copy Printed at Rome in 1914. Revised Edition, with the Imprimatur of His Eminence Cardinal Gibbons. Baltimore: John Murphy Company, 1916. p. 95.
 Rev. Richard Stanton. A Menology of England and Wales, or, Brief Memorials of the Ancient British and English Saints Arranged According to the Calendar, Together with the Martyrs of the 16th and 17th Centuries. London: Burns & Oates, 1892. pp. 141–143.
Greek Sources
 Great Synaxaristes:  3 Απριλιου. Μεγασ Συναξαριστησ.
  Συναξαριστής. 3 Απριλίου. Ecclesia.gr. (H Εκκλησια Τησ ΕΛΛαδοσ). 
Russian Sources
  16 апреля (3 апреля). Православная Энциклопедия под редакцией Патриарха Московского и всея Руси Кирилла (электронная версия). (Orthodox Encyclopedia - Pravenc.ru).
  3 апреля (ст.ст.) 16 апреля 2013 (нов. ст.) . Русская Православная Церковь Отдел внешних церковных связей.

April in the Eastern Orthodox calendar